Vagn Loft (September 24, 1915 – May 10, 1976) was a Danish field hockey player who competed in the 1936 Summer Olympics and in the 1948 Summer Olympics.

He was born in Copenhagen and died in Stengård, Gladsaxe.

In 1936 he was a squad member of the Danish team which was eliminated in the group stage of the Olympic tournament. He played one match in the consolation round.

Twelve years later he was eliminated with the Danish team in the first round of the 1948 Olympic tournament. He played two matches as forward.

External links
 
profile

1915 births
1976 deaths
Danish male field hockey players
Olympic field hockey players of Denmark
Field hockey players at the 1936 Summer Olympics
Field hockey players at the 1948 Summer Olympics
Sportspeople from Copenhagen